Vernon Township is one of the thirteen townships of Clinton County, Ohio, United States. The 2010 census reported 2,997 people living in the township, 2,449 of whom were in the unincorporated portions.

Geography
Located in the western part of the county, it borders the following townships:
Adams Township - north
Union Township - northeast corner
Washington Township - east
Marion Township - south
Harlan Township, Warren County - southwest
Washington Township, Warren County - west

The entire township lies in the Virginia Military District.

Cowan Lake State Park is located partially in Vernon Township.

The village of Clarksville is located in western Vernon Township.

Transportation
Major highways include State Routes 132, 133, 350, and 730, and the 3C Highway.

Name and history
Vernon Township was organized in 1810.

Statewide, other Vernon Townships are located in Crawford and Trumbull counties.

Government
The township is governed by a three-member board of trustees, who are elected in November of odd-numbered years to a four-year term beginning on the following January 1. Two are elected in the year after the presidential election and one is elected in the year before it. There is also an elected township fiscal officer, who serves a four-year term beginning on April 1 of the year after the election, which is held in November of the year before the presidential election. Vacancies in the fiscal officership or on the board of trustees are filled by the remaining trustees.

Education
The township is in the Clinton-Massie Local School District.

References
Clinton County Historical Society.  Clinton County, Ohio, 1982.  Wilmington, Ohio:  The Society, 1982.
Ohio Atlas & Gazetteer.  6th ed. Yarmouth, Maine:  DeLorme, 2001.  
Ohio. Secretary of State.  The Ohio municipal and township roster, 2002-2003.  Columbus, Ohio:  The Secretary, 2003.

External links
County website

Townships in Clinton County, Ohio
Townships in Ohio